General elections were held in Liechtenstein in March 1872. Seven of the seats in the Landtag were indirectly elected by electors selected by voters.

Electors
Electors were selected through elections that were held between 1 and 8 March. Each municipality had two electors for every 100 inhabitants.

Results
The electors met on 18 March in Vaduz to elect seven Landtag members and five substitute members. The Landtag members and their substitutes were elected in three ballots. Of the 158 electors, 150 participated in the voting.

References 

Liechtenstein
1872 in Liechtenstein
Elections in Liechtenstein
March 1872 events